A list of windmills in Cornwall, including those in the Isles of Scilly.

Cornwall

Isles of Scilly

Maps

1675 John Ogilby
1690 Collins
1693 Collins
1748 Martyn
1810 Ordnance Survey
1827 C & J Greenwood

See also

 List of farms in Cornwall

Notes

Mills in bold are still standing, known building dates are indicated in bold. Text in italics denotes indicates that the information is not confirmed, but is likely to be the case stated.

Sources

Unless otherwise stated, the source for all entries is

References

Windmills
Cornwall
Agricultural buildings in Cornwall
Industrial archaeological sites in Cornwall